General José María Cabral y Luna (born Ingenio Nuevo; December 12, 1816 in San Cristóbal Province – February 28, 1899 in Santo Domingo) was a Dominican military figure and politician.  He served as the first Supreme Chief of the Dominican Republic from August 4, 1865 to November 15 of that year and again officially as president from August 22, 1866 until January 3, 1868.

Early life and family
Cabral was born near San Cristóbal to a prominent and wealthy Criollo family from Hincha. His parents were Ramona de Luna y Andújar, who was cousin of the Virgins of Galindo, and Juan Marcos Cabral y Aybar.

He was uncle of future Dominican president Marcos Antonio Cabral.

Politics

Presidency
On August 17, 1865 President Cabral abolished capital punishment and banishment in the Dominican Republic.

References

Biography at the Enciclopedia Virtual Dominicana

|-

1816 births
1899 deaths
19th-century Dominican Republic politicians
People of the Dominican Restoration War
People from San Cristóbal Province
Presidents of the Dominican Republic
Dominican Republic independence activists
Dominican Republic military personnel
Dominican Republic revolutionaries
Dominican Republic politicians 
Dominican Republic people of Portuguese descent
Dominican Republic people of Spanish descent
White Dominicans